The following is a timeline of the history of the city of Sulaymaniyah, Iraq.

Prior to 20th century
 1784 - 14 November: Sulaymaniyah founded.
 1785 - Great Mosque built 
 1851 - Sulaymaniyah was joined to Shahrizor Eyalet.

20th century
 1918 - Sulaymaniyah occupied by British forces on November.
 1937 - Public Park opens.
 1944 - Library of Sulaymaniyah established.
 1956 - Al-Sulaymaniyah FC (football club) formed.
 1961 - Sulaymaniyah Museum established.
 1967 - 11 May: Sulaymaniyah Chamber of Commerce and industry founded.
 1968 - University of Sulaymaniyah established .
 1970 - Union of Kurdish Writers established.
 1982 - 23 April: Demonstration against Iraqi Regime. 
 1991 - 7 March: Uprising against Saddam Hussein.
 1995 - Amna Suraka Museum opens.
 1996 
 Hosseiniyeh Al-Hakim built.
 Sulaimani Polytechnic University established.

21st century
 2006 - The American University of Iraq established.
 2011 - 17 February: Demonstration against Domestic government and a small group of protesters tried to storm the headquarters of the Kurdistan Democratic Party and threw rocks at the building .
 2020 
 2 December: A many teachers and employees got out in the street against didn't get salary from a few months from Kurdistan Regional Government
 7 December: The Kurdish security forces raided NRT’s headquarters channel and closed it.

References

Years in Iraq
Sulaymaniyah
Sulaymaniyah
Iraqi Kurdistan
History of Sulaymaniyah Governorate